is a 2013 Japanese crime drama film directed by Kazuya Shiraishi, starring Takayuki Yamada, Lily Franky, and Pierre Taki.

This Film was inspired by serial murder case which involved the Ryoji Goto and Shizuo Mikami.

Cast
 Takayuki Yamada as Shuichi Fujii
 Lily Franky as Takao Kimura
 Pierre Taki as Junji Sudo
 Chizuru Ikewaki as Yoko Fujii
 Kazuko Shirakawa as Yurie Ushiba
 Katsuya Kobayashi as Kuniyuki Igarashi
 Ryotaro Yonemura as Kenichi Sasaki
 Izumi Matsuoka as Shizue Tono
 Yu Saito as Yoshimasa Hino
 Jitsuko Yoshimura as Kazuko Fujii
 Boo Jiji as Satoru Ushiba
 Nozomi Muraoka as Rie Shibakawa

Reception
Film Business Asia's Derek Elley gave the film a rating of 7 out of 10. Kwenton Bellette of Twitch Film criticized the film.

The film has been nominated for several awards at the 37th Japan Academy Prize, including for Picture of the Year.

References

External links

 

2013 films
2013 crime drama films
Films based on non-fiction books
Japanese crime drama films
Films directed by Kazuya Shiraishi
Yakuza films
2010s Japanese films